The Cabinet of Win Myint (Burmese: ဦးဝင်းမြင့်အစိုးရ), co-headed by President Win Myint and State Counsellor Aung San Suu Kyi, was the executive body of Myanmar from 30 March 2018 to 1 February 2021. It took office on 30 March 2018, following the resignation of former president Htin Kyaw and the subsequent election. Following the 2021 Myanmar coup d'état, the cabinet was removed and replaced by a Military Government.

Heads and Deputy Heads

Cabinet

References 

2018 establishments in Myanmar
Cabinets established in 2018
Cabinet of Myanmar